Lukacovce may refer to several places in Slovakia:

Lukáčovce - Nitra District
Lukačovce - Humenne District